, also known as Demon Slayer: Mugen Train or Demon Slayer: Infinity Train, is a 2020 Japanese animated dark fantasy action film based on the "Mugen Train" arc of the shōnen manga series Demon Slayer: Kimetsu no Yaiba by Koyoharu Gotouge. The film, which is a direct sequel to the first season of the anime television series, was directed by Haruo Sotozaki and written by Ufotable staff members. The film was produced by Ufotable in association with Aniplex and Shueisha.

The film was released during the COVID-19 pandemic, premiering on October 16, 2020, in Japan, by Toho (in partnership with Aniplex); and late 2020 to mid-2021 internationally. It set a number of box office records, including becoming the highest-grossing Japanese film of all time.

The film has received numerous awards, including Animation of the Year at the 44th Japan Academy Film Prize as well as the Best Animation Film at the 45th Hochi Film Award.

Demon Slayer: Kimetsu no Yaiba – To the Swordsmith Village, a second film adaptation, compilating the "Swordsmith Village" arc, was released on February 3, 2023.

Plot
Tanjiro Kamado, his demonic younger sister Nezuko, and his friends Zenitsu Agatsuma and Inosuke Hashibira board the Mugen Train to assist the Flame Hashira Kyojuro Rengoku in his mission to hunt for a demon that has caused forty people to go missing. Soon after boarding, they are attacked by two demons which Kyojuro quickly kills. Directly after, all of them except for Nezuko fall into a deep sleep, the work of Enmu, Lower One of the Twelve Kizuki.

Enmu instructs four passengers, all suffering from severe insomnia, to enter the Demon Slayers' dreams and destroy their spiritual cores to cripple them. In exchange, Enmu will grant them a peaceful sleep. During their sleep, the Demon Slayers have idealistic dreams; Tanjiro reunites with his deceased family, Kyojuro reminisces on his past with his younger brother Senjuro and alcoholic father Shinjuro, Zenitsu envisions a life with Nezuko, and Inosuke imagines himself as a leader. All of the passengers fail to destroy their spiritual cores. Tanjiro, thanks to Nezuko's outside help realizes that he is dreaming, tearfully abandons his family and tries to wake up, succeeding after a vision of his father instructs him to kill himself in the dream. 

At her brother's instructions, Nezuko uses her Blood Demon Art to sever the intruders' connection to the others, awakening the passengers. Angered at being refused their own dreams, they attack Tanjiro, who knocks them all out except for his intruder, who had refused Enmu's orders to harm him despite his own suffering from tuberculosis. While Nezuko awakens the others, Tanjiro confronts Enmu on top of the train and decapitates him in the ensuing battle. However, Enmu reveals that he fused himself with the train, preparing to devour all of the passengers within. 

With everyone now awake, Kyojuro instructs Inosuke and Tanjiro to look for Enmu's neck while he, Nezuko, and Zenitsu stay behind to protect the other passengers. Tanjiro and Inosuke find Enmu's neckbone in the locomotive but are caught off guard by its defenses, including a Blood Demon Art which constantly puts them to sleep. The conductor, also under the control of Enmu, ends up stabbing Tanjiro in the chaos. With Inosuke, Tanjiro is able to expose and destroy Enmu's neckbone, killing him and derailing the train. As Tanjiro attempts to recover from his wounds, Kyojuro arrives to help teach him how to stabilize them with his breathing techniques. 

Suddenly, they are attacked by Upper Three of the Twelve Kizuki, Akaza, who tries to persuade Kyojuro to turn into a demon and become immortal, after sensing his already immense power. Kyojuro vehemently refuses, and he and Akaza commence a fight to the death, with Tanjiro and Inosuke unable to assist him. Despite his perseverance, Kyojuro is unable to match Akaza's regenerative abilities. After Kyojuro attempts his most powerful move as a last resort, Akaza manages to fatally injure him by impaling his solar plexus. Kyojuro attempts to keep him at bay for long enough for the sun to kill him, but Akaza breaks free, breaking Kyojuro's sword in the process, and escapes into the adjacent forest. 

In a last-ditch effort to stop him, an enraged Tanjiro throws his sword at Akaza, impaling the demon's chest. Akaza escapes nonetheless as Tanjiro breaks down, calling him a coward. Kyojuro encourages Tanjiro and his friends to continue on their paths and never give up before succumbing to his injuries and reuniting with his mother in the afterlife while the Demon Slayers mourn his death. The remaining Hashiras receive the news of Kyojuro's passing, while the head of the Demon Slayer Corps, Kagaya Ubuyashiki, appreciates him for not letting a single passenger or comrade die in his presence, stating that he will be glad to reunite with him when he finally passes.

Voice cast

Production
Yūma Takahashi, the producer of the anime series, indicated a desire to continue production of the series with the Ufotable Production Team. The sequel project was greenlit following the success of the television series. A film was determined to be the best format for the "Mugen Train" arc due to the arc's shorter content and dramatic pacing. The main cast was made aware of the film project midway through the first season of the television series. The main production staff from the anime television series, as well as the cast, were carried over into the film's production. Haruo Sotozaki served as director, with Akira Matsushima and Manabu Kamino serving as animator and editor of the film, respectively. The film was announced on September 28, 2019, immediately following the airing of the anime series' season finale.

Release

Theatrical
The film was released theatrically in Japan on October 16, 2020. Because other major releases had been delayed as a result of the COVID-19 pandemic, the number of available screens was higher than usual. The film opened in 403 cinemas total, including all 38 IMAX cinemas within the country. The film had a very staggered international release, being released from as early as October 30, 2020, in Taiwan, to as late as August 13, 2021, in India. The theatrical release in China was delayed when a controversy surrounding the film Monster Hunter led the Chinese censors to review some foreign films a second time.

Home media
The film was released on Blu-ray and DVD in Japan on June 16, 2021; it sold over 800,000 units in its first day and over  units in three days. In North America, the film was released digitally on June 22, 2021; pre-orders began on April 26, 2021. On April 26, 2021, two months before its official release, the film was accidentally made available for purchase on the PlayStation Store for a few hours before being removed, resulting in leaked copies being distributed across the Internet. Upon its video-on-demand (VOD) release in North America, the film debuted at number one on the Vudu, Google Play and YouTube charts. A novel adaptation was released on October 16, 2020.

Television series version
The first part of the second season of the anime television series, subtitled Mugen Train Arc, is an extended and recompiled version of the film that ran for a total of 7 episodes. The first episode of the part is an entirely new episode that focuses on what Kyojuro did immediately before the events of the film, while the remaining 6 episodes are recompiled cuts of the film with several slight edits performed on them to account for its episodic format. It was broadcast in Japan from October 10 to November 28, 2021.

Reception

Box office

It was the first time in the history of cinema that a non-Hollywood production topped the annual worldwide box office. It also became the highest-grossing R-rated animated film of all time.

Prior to its release in Japan, the film set monthly sales records for advance tickets sold for two consecutive months in September and October 2020. The film became the first film to top the Japanese box office charts for ten consecutive weekends since the charts began publication in 2004, and ultimately remained in the top 10 for 32 weeks, the second-highest number of consecutive weeks in the Japanese charts behind Titanics 40 weeks in the late 1990s. After 220 days of release, it became the first film in the history of Japanese cinema to gross .

Outside of Japan, its highest gross in a single market was in the United States and Canada, where it was released on April 23, 2021, and grossed  to become the second-highest-grossing anime film of all time in the market, after Pokémon: The First Movie which grossed . Its North American opening weekend gross of  set the record as the biggest opening for any foreign-language film released in North America. It became the highest-grossing animated film of all time in Taiwan by grossing  in 17 days after its release and went on to gross  in total. In Hong Kong, the film topped the box office for four consecutive weekends following its opening on November 12, 2020, but its box office run came to a halt as all the cinemas in Hong Kong were shut down on December 2, 2020 amidst the outbreak of the fourth wave of COVID-19 pandemic in Hong Kong; cinemas did not reopen again until February 18, 2021.

The box-office success of the film was attributed to a confluence of different factors by Roland Kelts. Among these were being released during a period of relative calm in the COVID-19 pandemic in Japan, which meant that theatres were open but competition from other films was low, and the protracted sequential release of the manga, anime and film which allowed anticipation to build up over time.

Critical response

On the review aggregator website Rotten Tomatoes, 98% of 48 critics' reviews are positive, with an average rating of 7.8/10. The site's critics consensus reads, "Demon Slayer visually stunning animation and masterful action set pieces serve a heartfelt plot that is sure to satisfy fans." According to Metacritic, which assigned a weighted average score of 72 out of 100 based on 10 critics, the film received "generally favorable reviews". Upon release in North American theaters, Mugen Train earned a 92% positive score from a PostTrak audience poll. Demon Slayer: Kimetsu no Yaiba the Movie: Mugen Train was one of the Jury Recommended works at the 25th Japan Media Arts Festival in 2022.

Crunchyroll reviewer Daryl Harding gave the film a positive review, praising the combination of 2D and 3D animation techniques, the music, and the character writing. IndieWire reviewer David Ehrlich, who gave the film a "C" on an A to F scale, likewise praised the film for its striking visuals, and for the characters of Kyōjurō Rengoku and Enmu, but said its R rating was excessive. By contrast, Anime News Network reviewer Kim Morrissy and Variety reviewer Peter Debruge compared the animation quality unfavourably to that of the TV series. Harding, Ehrlich, Morrissy and Debruge all noted that fully understanding and appreciating the film requires having watched the first season of the anime beforehand.

Accolades

Notes

References

External links
 
 

Demon Slayer: Kimetsu no Yaiba
2020 anime films
2020 films
2020s Japanese-language films
2020s fantasy action films
2020s monster movies
Japanese animated feature films
Animated films about trains
Animated films based on animated series
Anime action films
Anime films based on manga
Anime films composed by Yuki Kajiura
Aniplex
Crunchyroll Anime Awards winners
Dark fantasy anime and manga
Demons in film
Films about suicide
Films about hypnosis
Films about mass murder
Films about massacres
Japan Academy Prize for Animation of the Year winners
Mass murder in fiction
Anime and manga about revenge
Films set in the Taishō period
Funimation
IMAX films
Japanese animated fantasy films
Japanese dark fantasy films
Japanese fantasy action films
Toho animated films
Ufotable
Vampires in animated film
Japanese adult animated films